Translucence/Drift Music is a double studio album by American ambient musician Harold Budd and English musician and graphic artist John Foxx, which was released in August 2003.  Budd and Foxx had long been engaged by the other's work, eventually working together in 1996.  These two discs are a record of those sessions.

Track listing

All tracks composed by Harold Budd and John Foxx.

Translucence (disc one)
 "Subtext" – 5:59
 "Spoken Roses" – 6:20
 "Momentary Architecture" – 1:40
 "Adult" – 3:03
 "Long Light" – 3:54
 "A Change in the Weather" – 2:41
 "Here and Now" – 3:59
 "Almost Overlooked" – 2:30
 "Implicit" – 5:25
 "Raindust" – 7:08
 "Missing Person" – 1:35
 "You Again" – 3:24

Drift Music (disc two)
 "Sunlight Silhouette" – 3:15
 "The Other Room" – 1:57
 "Some Way Through All the Cities" – 4:17
 "Stepping Sideways" – 3:44
 "A Delicate Romance" – 7:14
 "Linger" – 1:59
 "Curtains Blowing" – 3:06
 "Weather Patterns" – 1:50
 "Coming into Focus" – 5:02
 "After All This Time" – 6:54
 "Someone Almost There" – 1:33
 "Resonant Frequency" – 2:45
 "Avenue of Trees" – 1:16
 "Underwater Flowers" – 6:05
 "Arriving" – 1:25

References

Harold Budd albums
John Foxx albums
2003 albums
Ambient albums by English artists
Ambient albums by American artists